Gregory John Page,  (born 16 January 1972) is an Australian singer, musician and actor. He is best known as the original lead singer and a founding member of the children's band the Wiggles from 1991 to 2006 and then again in 2012. Page has also recorded several solo albums.

Early life and career
Page was born in Sydney, Australia. He grew up in Northmead, New South Wales where he attended Baulkham Hills Primary School. Growing up, he had a low self-esteem. By the time he was 16, his hair started graying. He performed in several bands in secondary school. He was a member of the band Dead Giveaway. He was a roadie for and sang with the Australian band the Cockroaches during their final years. On bandmate Anthony Field's recommendation, he enrolled in Macquarie University to study Early Childhood Education. While students, Page, Field, and guitarist Murray Cook, along with former Cockroaches member and keyboardist Jeff Fatt, combined their music backgrounds and teaching skills to form the Wiggles.

1991–2006: Music and the Wiggles
Field described Page as "the perfect straight man", with a "big friendly smile and easy stage manner" which made him engrossing for both children and adults. Also according to Field, Page "has an authoritative, though not overbearing, tone when he speaks to children and is a relaxed and clever emcee". When performing with the Wiggles, Page wore a yellow shirt. Like the other Wiggles, Page had a shtick, which was doing magic tricks.

His 2005 solo album, Taking Care of Country, reflects Page's interest in Elvis Presley's music. It was recorded with the TCB Band, Elvis' back-up band. In spring 2003, Page performed in Las Vegas with the TCB Band. In 2002, Page sang back-up with Australian Elvis impersonator Mick Gerace. His second album with the TCB Band, Let It Be Me, was released in 2012. Production of the album began in 2004, but was interrupted due to Page's medical issues.

2006–2012: Illness and retirement
On 30 November 2006, the Wiggles announced that Page would leave the group due to poor health.

Page had experienced health difficulties since December 2005, when he underwent a double hernia operation and withdrew from his group's U.S. tour in August 2006 after suffering repeated fainting spells, slurred speech, fatigue, and trembling. Although Page was missing for virtually all of the late 2006 U.S. tour, audiences were informed of Page's absence at concerts moments before the curtain went up.

At first, Page was told that he had seven years to live, but he was diagnosed with a non-life-threatening form of dysautonomia, a difficult-to-diagnose chronic illness. Page experienced symptoms such as orthostatic intolerance, fatigue and loss of balance. Specialists believed that Page had mild episodes of the illness going back twelve years, and that his symptoms worsened after his hernias. It was decided that Page would retire from performing with the Wiggles to better manage his health. As part owner of the Wiggles, Page received a payout of about $20 million for his share in the business. Page was succeeded by Sam Moran as a full member of the entertainment side of the group (although still an employee, rather than a partner, in its business side).

By late 2009, Page had recovered enough from his illness to begin touring with another country rock band, but with a more limited schedule than the Wiggles. He had also started his own foundation, the Greg Page Fund, to raise funds and educate the public about orthostatic intolerance.

While in retirement, Page was a presenter on Sydney Weekender.

2012: Reunion with the Wiggles
In January 2012, and amidst a great deal of controversy, the Wiggles announced that Page had regained his health and was returning to his role as the Yellow Wiggle. It was reported that he would return to touring with the group in March of that year.

However, on 17 May 2012, it was announced that Page, along with Murray Cook and Jeff Fatt, would again be retiring from the Wiggles at the end of the year. He was to be replaced by Wiggles cast member Emma Watkins, the first female member of the Wiggles. Page eventually revealed that he was only asked to return to the group until August 2012, "to help transition from Sam [Moran] to a new Yellow Wiggle," but once Cook and Fatt decided to retire at the end of the year, they asked Page if he would extend his stay with the group until then so he would leave alongside them, to which he agreed. Page and the others expected to remain involved with the creative and production aspects of the group, though Page no longer would have a share in the company, having sold it in 2006 when he left.

2013–present: Post-Wiggles
Shortly after leaving the Wiggles, Page joined the cast of the children's educational television program Butterscotch's Playground. Page helped develop the show with its creators. From time to time, beginning in 2016, Page has performed with the Wiggles for reunion shows and charity fundraisers. In July 2020, six months after suffering a heart attack, he and the original Wiggles appeared in The Soul Movers music video "Circles Baby".

Personal life
Page amassed the fourth-largest collection of Elvis Presley memorabilia in the world, including clothing, marriage certificate, guitar, piano, Elvis's final Cadillac, and original TCB Band necklaces. In 2008, Page permanently loaned the collection, reportedly worth $1.5 million, to a new Elvis museum named "The King's Castle" in Parkes, New South Wales.

Page has been married twice. His first marriage broke up during his retirement from the Wiggles; by 2011, he had remarried. He has four children.

Page was appointed a Member of the Order of Australia on 26 January 2010: "For service to the arts, particularly children's entertainment, and to the community as a benefactor and supporter of a range of charities".

On 17 January 2020, Page suffered a cardiac arrest at a Wiggles reunion show that was raising funds for bushfire relief efforts. He collapsed on stage and stopped breathing; off-duty nurse Grace Jones, who was in the audience, performed CPR with Wiggles drummer Steve Pace and band staff member Kimmy Antonelli, and used a defibrillator three times before Page was transported to the hospital. The cardiac arrest was caused by a blocked artery, which was treated, and Page has since made a full recovery. He later posted a video explaining the situation and expressing his gratitude to those who saved him, including Jones, Pace, Antonelli, and Dr. Therese Wales, as well as other members of the Wiggles' crew. Page has since become an advocate for heart health and more widespread knowledge of CPR, founding a nonprofit initiative called "Heart of the Nation", which has the goal of increasing public awareness of defibrillator locations across Australia, as well as encouraging businesses to keep a defibrillator on-site.

Solo discography
Greg Page (1998)
I Believe in Music (2002)
Greg Page Live in Concert (2003)
Throw Your Arms Around Me (2004)
Taking Care of Country (2005)
Let It Be Me (2012)
Here Comes Christmas! (2015)

Books
   (paperback, 341pp.),  (e-book, 352pp.)

References

Works cited

External links

1972 births
Living people
APRA Award winners
Australian children's musicians
The Wiggles members
Members of the Order of Australia
Macquarie University alumni
Musicians from Sydney
Australian male singers
Australian guitarists
Australian multi-instrumentalists
Australian male guitarists